Martin Crawford is a British author who is the founder and director of the Agroforestry Research Trust.

He runs regular tours of the  2-acre forest garden at Dartington in Devon as well as the Littlehempston site as well as courses in the design of Forest Gardens.

Books

How to Grow Perennial Vegetables. Green Books. 2012.
Food from your Forest Garden (with Caroline Aitken). Green Books. 2013
Trees for Gardens, Orchards and Permaculture. Permanent Publications. 2015.
How to Grow your own Nuts. Green Books. 2016.
Shrubs for Gardens, Agroforestry and Permaculture. Permanent Publications. 2020

References

External links
 
 

Year of birth missing (living people)
Living people
Agroforestry
British charity and campaign group workers